Same-sex marriage in Montana has been recognized since a federal district court ruled the state's ban on same-sex marriage unconstitutional on November 19, 2014. Montana had previously denied marriage rights to same-sex couples by statute since 1997 and in its State Constitution since 2004. The state appealed the ruling to the Ninth Circuit Court of Appeals, but before that court could hear the case, the U.S. Supreme Court struck down all same-sex marriage bans in the country in Obergefell v. Hodges, mooting any remaining appeals.

Same-sex marriage

Statute
In 1997, the Montana Legislature passed a ban on same-sex marriage and any "contractual relationship entered into for the purpose of achieving a civil relationship".

Constitution
On November 2, 2004, Montana voters approved Initiative 96, a state-initiated constitutional amendment that prohibited the recognition of same-sex marriage, as well as anything "identical or substantially similar to marital status" in the state of Montana.

Lawsuits

Rolando v. Fox
Four same-sex couples represented by the American Civil Liberties Union (ACLU) and local attorneys filed a lawsuit in federal district court in Great Falls on May 21, 2014, challenging the Montana Constitution's definition of marriage as the union of one man and one woman and related statutes. The plaintiffs in the suit, Rolando v. Fox, were three couples (Shauna and Nicole Goubeaux, Ben Milano and Chase Weinhandl, and Sue Hawthorne and Adel Johnson) who had married in Hawaii, Iowa, and Washington, respectively. A fourth couple, Angela and Tonya Rolando, were denied a marriage license by the Cascade County Clerk of Court. Governor Steve Bullock expressed support for the plaintiffs. Attorney General Tim Fox defended the state. On October 15, citing the recent decision of the Ninth Circuit Court of Appeals in Latta v. Otter and Sevcik v. Sandoval, which ended bans on same-sex marriage in Idaho and Nevada, the plaintiffs asked the court for summary judgment. Their brief compared the texts of Montana's ban with those of Idaho and Nevada and used the Latta decision to counter the state's arguments. U.S. District Court Judge Brian Morris ruled for the plaintiffs on November 19, 2014, and his injunction against the state's enforcement of its ban on same-sex marriage took effect immediately. Among the first couples to marry were Tonya and Angela Rolando, plaintiffs in Rolando, who filed marriage paperwork and were married at the Cascade County Courthouse on Thursday morning, November 20. Leslie Burgess and Serena Early were the first couple to be issued a marriage license in Missoula County. Former Supreme Court Judge James C. Nelson officiated at the wedding of Linda Gryczan and Constance Enzweiler, a couple for 31 years, who were the first to marry in Helena, the state capital, on November 20.

Governor Bullock welcomed the court ruling, saying, "Today's decision ensures we are closer to fulfilling our promise of freedom, dignity, and equality for all Montanans. It is a day to celebrate our progress, while recognizing the qualities that bind us as Montanans: a desire to make a good life for ourselves and our families, while providing greater opportunities to the next generation. I have instructed my administration to quickly take all appropriate steps to ensure that we are recognizing and affording the same rights and responsibilities to legally married same-sex couples that all married Montanans have long enjoyed." Senator John Walsh said, "Today's overdue court ruling reflects our Montana values of individual freedom, fairness and equality. I believe every Montanan – our sons, daughters, friends and family – should live free of discrimination.", and Senator Jon Tester also welcomed the court decision, saying, "I applaud today's ruling. It aligns our laws with our values and is a big step forward for our state. Denying same-sex couples the right to marry denies them happiness and equal protection under the law." Representative Steve Daines said he was "disappointed that an unelected federal judge ha[d] ignored Montanans' voice".

Attorney General Fox announced plans to appeal the decision to the Ninth Circuit. At the request of all parties, the Ninth Circuit suspended proceedings in the state's appeal on February 9, 2015, pending action by the Supreme Court in Obergefell v. Hodges. On June 26, 2015, the Supreme Court ruled in Obergefell that laws depriving same-sex couples of the rights of marriage violate the Due Process and Equal Protection clauses of the Fourteenth Amendment, striking down all same-sex marriage bans in the country and mooting the state's appeal to the Ninth Circuit.

Donaldson v. State of Montana
In July 2010, seven same-sex couples in Montana filed a lawsuit against the state. The suit contended that even with the ban on same-sex marriage, the State Constitution's guarantees of privacy, dignity, and the pursuit of life's basic necessities and its guarantees of equal protection and due process require the state to offer same-sex couples the same rights and protections it offers to different-sex couples through marriage. A state district court heard oral arguments in January 2011 in the case, Donaldson v. State of Montana. The city of Bozeman backed their suit. The court ruled against the plaintiffs on April 19, 2011, and the plaintiffs, represented by the ACLU, appealed that decision to the Montana Supreme Court on August 4, arguing that the marriage amendment does not preclude providing rights other than the name "marriage" to same-sex couples. On December 17, 2012, that court in a 4–3 decision denied the plaintiffs' request to find Montana's entire "statutory scheme" unconstitutional, but invited them to renew their suit in district court by specifying the statutes they were challenging.

Demographics and statistics
Data from the 2000 U.S. census showed that 1,218 same-sex couples were living in Montana. By 2005, this had increased to 1,662 couples, likely attributed to same-sex couples' growing willingness to disclose their partnerships on government surveys. Same-sex couples lived in all counties of the state, except Liberty County, and constituted 0.6% of coupled households and 0.3% of all households in the state. Most couples lived in Missoula, Yellowstone and Cascade counties, but the counties with the highest percentage of same-sex couples were Big Horn (0.82% of all county households), Garfield (0.75%) and Jefferson (0.67%). Same-sex partners in Montana were on average younger than opposite-sex partners, and more likely to be employed. However, the average and median household incomes of same-sex couples were lower than different-sex couples, and same-sex couples were also far less likely to own a home than opposite-sex partners. 35% of same-sex couples in Montana were raising children under the age of 18, with an estimated 762 children living in households headed by same-sex couples in 2005.

436 same-sex couples married in Montana in the first year after legalization.

Native American nations
The Law and Order Code of the Blackfeet Nation specifies that state law and state jurisdiction govern marriage relations and that neither common-law marriages nor marriages performed under native customs are valid within the Blackfeet Reservation. In 2006, a traditional Blackfoot marriage ceremony was held in Seeley Lake for a two-spirit couple. As same-sex marriage is legal under state law, same-sex couples can also marry on the Blackfeet Reservation. The Crow Tribe of Montana's Law and Order Code provides that marriage is a consensual relationship between "a man and a woman" arising out of a civil contract. However, the code also states that marriages which are validly contracted under the laws of the place where they occurred are recognized as valid within the Crow Indian Reservation. Likewise, the Tribal Code of the Northern Cheyenne Tribe defines marriage as "a personal relationship between a man and a woman", but states that marriages validly performed under the laws of the jurisdiction where performed are valid in its reservation. Similar language is found in the codes of the Assiniboine and Sioux Tribes, and the Gros Ventre and Assiniboine Tribes. The laws of the Confederated Salish and Kootenai Tribes are silent on who can marry, "The Code is silent on defining who can marry. If the Tribal Code is silent, then we rely on federal law first and then state law.", said a tribal member during a meeting of the Tribal Council on December 20, 2016.

Marriages between two-spirit people and cisgender men or women have been historically performed among these tribes. They were revered as warriors, directed the traditional scalp dances, were believed to be able to talk to coyotes, and were known for their skills in matchmaking, particularly for young, unmarried men who sought to impress young women. The he'émáné'e often served as a second wife in a married man's polygynous household. The Crow  would marry either women or men. Osh-Tisch, a famous Crow baté, adorned women's clothing and married a woman. The Flathead call them  . One famous Kutenai two-spirit person was Kaúxuma Núpika, who, after leaving his White fur trader husband, returned to his people and adopted men's clothing and weapons, and took a wife. Kaúxuma was one of the "principal leaders" of the tribe and supernatural powers were attributed to him. He "is remembered among the Kutenai as a respected shamanic healer", a masculine occupation. The two-spirit status thus allowed for marriages between two biological males or two biological females to be performed in these tribes.

Domestic partnerships
In 2004, the Montana Supreme Court ruled in Snetsinger v. Montana University System that the University of Montana's policy of denying insurance coverage to the same-sex domestic partners of its gay and lesbian employees violated the State Constitution's equal protection requirements.<ref>Justia.com: [http://law.justia.com/cases/montana/supreme-court/2004/b51d5127-e044-4ec1-a862-e0ad3d49b16b.html Snetsinger v. Montana University System], accessed April 25, 2011</ref> Montana has provided benefits to same-sex partners of state employees since 2005.

A domestic partnership bill was introduced to the Montana Legislature in 2009. It would have provided for basic rights such as hospital visitation access for one's partner and joint property ownership, but was swiftly killed in the Legislature.HB 590

On April 3, 2003, Missoula County commissioners approved a domestic partnership registry for the county. It went into effect on July 1, 2003. A similar domestic partnership registry went into force in Missoula on October 1, 2013.Missoula City Council passes domestic partnership registry resolution The Missoula City Council voted to repeal the city's domestic partnership registry in October 2022, citing the legalization of same-sex marriage as a reason that "the registry was no longer needed".

Public opinion
{| class="wikitable"
|+style="font-size:100%" | Public opinion for same-sex marriage in Montana
|-
! style="width:190px;"| Poll source
! style="width:200px;"| Date(s)administered
! class=small | Samplesize
! Margin oferror
! style="width:100px;"| % support
! style="width:100px;"| % opposition
! style="width:40px;"| % no opinion
|-
| Public Religion Research Institute
| align=center| March 8–November 9, 2021
| align=center| ?
| align=center| ?
|  align=center| 62%
| align=center| 38%
| align=center| <0.5%
|-
| Public Religion Research Institute
| align=center| January 7–December 20, 2020
| align=center| 254 random telephoneinterviewees
| align=center| ?
|  align=center| 69%
| align=center| 30%
| align=center| 1%
|-
| Public Religion Research Institute
| align=center| April 5–December 23, 2017
| align=center| 348 random telephoneinterviewees
| align=center| ?
|  align=center| 57%
| align=center| 37%
| align=center| 6%
|-
| Public Religion Research Institute
| align=center| May 18, 2016–January 10, 2017
| align=center| 524 random telephoneinterviewees
| align=center| ?
|  align=center| 53%
| align=center| 36%
| align=center| 11%
|-
| Public Religion Research Institute
| align=center| April 29, 2015–January 7, 2016
| align=center| 465 random telephoneinterviewees
| align=center| ?
|  align=center| 49%| align=center| 43%
| align=center| 8%
|-
| New York Times/CBS News/YouGov
| align=center| September 20–October 1, 2014
| align=center| 549 likely voters
| align=center| ± 4.5%
|  align=center| 45%| align=center| 41%
| align=center| 14%
|-
| MSU Billings
| align=center| October 2013
| align=center| 410 adults
| align=center| ± 5%
|  align=center| 46.6%| align=center| 42.6%
| align=center| 10.8%
|-
| Public Policy Polling
| align=center| June 21–23, 2013
| align=center| 807 registered voters
| align=center| ± 3.4%
| align=center| 42%
|  align=center| 48%| align=center| 10%
|-
| Public Policy Polling
| align=center| February 15–17, 2013
| align=center| 1,011 voters
| align=center| ± 3.1%
| align=center| 43%
|  align=center| 49%| align=center| 8%
|-
| Public Policy Polling
| align=center| April 26–29, 2012
| align=center| 934 voters
| align=center| ± 3.2%
| align=center| 41%
|  align=center| 48%''
| align=center| 11%
|-
| Public Policy Polling
| align=center| November 28–30, 2011
| align=center| 1,625 voters
| align=center| ± 2.4%
| align=center| 37%
|  align=center| 51%
| align=center| 12%
|-

See also
LGBT rights in Montana
Civil union in the United States
Domestic partnership in the United States
 Status of same-sex marriage
 Timeline of same-sex marriage

References

External links
 Rolando v. Fox, United States District Court for the District of Montana, November 19, 2014

LGBT in Montana
Politics of Montana
Montana
2014 in LGBT history
2014 in Montana